Charles-Louis Loys de Cheseaux (1730 – 1789) was a Swiss historian.

Life 
Born in Lausanne, he was a member of Bern's economic society.

Among his works is a history of physics in two volumes. Some of his works were translated in various languages in Europe.

Works

References

Bibliography

Related pages 
 Galileo Galilei

1730 births
1789 deaths
Historians of science
18th-century Swiss historians
Writers from Lausanne